Well... is the first album by the American singer-songwriter and actress Katey Sagal. It was released in 1994 via Virgin Records.

The album peaked at No. 33 on Billboard'''s Heatseekers Albums chart.

Critical receptionThe Advocate thought that "in an attempt to endow the schmaltzy lyrics with as much sincerity as possible, Sagal emotes almost to the point of parody."

AllMusic wrote that "the problem with Well...'''s lack of commercial success probably had to do with the fact that it was too smooth for blues fans and too bluesy for adult contemporary; of course, those are also its strengths."

Track listing
"Thunderhead (I Just Wanted a Little Rain)" (Julie Christensen) 3:40
"Can't Hurry the Harvest" (Katey Sagal, Phil Roy, Bob Thiele Jr.) 5:20
"Some Things Are Better Left Unsaid" (Sagal, Robbie Nevil, David Frank) 4:20
"That's How Love Goes" (Sagal, Thiele Jr., John Shanks) 4:55
"September Rain" (Sagal, Roy, Thiele Jr.) 6:15
"Peace" (Sagal, Roy, Thiele Jr.) 6:04
"All Is Well" (Brent Bourgeois, Bongo Bob Smith) 4:31
"Act of Faith" (Sagal, Shanks, Brent Bourgeois) 4:49
"I Don't Wanna Know" (Sagal, Roy, Thiele Jr.) 5:01
"Don't Know How to Let You Go" (Sagal, Shanks, Thiele Jr.) 4:38
"Best Part" (Kathy Fisher, Ron Wasserman) 3:52
"Dignity" (Sagal, Paul Gordon) 3:48

Personnel
Katey Sagal - vocals, piano
David Frank, John Philip Shenale - keyboards
Tom Keene - piano
Mark Goldenberg, Robbie Nevil, Phil Palmer, John Shanks - guitars
Amy Kanter, Joe Williams - gut-string guitars, backing vocals
Brent Bourgeois - gut-string guitars, keyboards, backing vocals
Bob Thiele Jr. - guitars, keyboards, programming, piano, backing vocals
Jim Hanson, Tom Lilly, Guy Pratt, Freddie "Ready Freddie" Washington - bass
Rupert Hine - electric and synthesized bass, organ, piano, keyboards, programming, backing vocals
Brian MacLeod, Jack White - drums
Paulinho da Costa, Debra Dobkin - percussion
Martin Tillman - cello
Rosemary Butler, Rita Coolidge, Laura Creamer, Julie Delgado, Beth Hooker, Kipp, Mark & Pat Lennon, Roger Manning, Sandy Simmons, Andy Sturmer, Billy Valentine - backing vocals

References

1994 debut albums
Albums produced by Rupert Hine
Virgin Records albums
Katey Sagal albums